The 1992 Nigerian Senate election in Kebbi State was held on July 4, 1992, to elect members of the Nigerian Senate to represent Kebbi State. Adamu Baba Augie representing Kebbi North, Aliyu Mohammed Nassarawa representing Kebbi Central and Bala Tafida Yauri representing Kebbi South all won on the platform of the National Republican Convention.

Overview

Summary

Results

Kebbi North 
The election was won by Adamu Baba Augie of the National Republican Convention.

Kebbi Central 
The election was won by Aliyu Mohammed Nassarawa of the National Republican Convention.

Kebbi South 
The election was won by Bala Tafida Yauri of the National Republican Convention.

References 

Keb
Kebbi State Senate elections
July 1992 events in Nigeria